Aprocius Megameno Petrus (born 9 October 1999) is a Namibian footballer who plays as a left back for Blue Waters and the Namibia national team.

References

External links

1999 births
Living people
Namibian men's footballers
Sportspeople from Walvis Bay
Association football fullbacks
Eleven Arrows F.C. players
Blue Waters F.C. players
Namibia Premier League players
Namibia international footballers
Namibia A' international footballers
2020 African Nations Championship players